Adnalı may refer to:
Adnalı, Jalilabad, Azerbaijan
Adnalı, Shamakhi, Azerbaijan